The 1945–46 season saw Rochdale compete for their 7th and final season in the wartime league (Division 3 North West). The season consisted of 36 matches, 18 of which were in the First Championship, and the remainder were in the 2nd Championship and Division 3 North West Cup. Rochdale finished in second place in the first championship. This season also saw the return of the F.A. Cup, in which Rochdale reached the third round.

Statistics
																

|}

Competitions

Third Division North West League and Cup

F.A. Cup

Lancashire Senior Cup

References

Rochdale A.F.C. seasons
Rochdale